Minister of Culture, Tourism and the Environment of Angola is a cabinet level position in the national government. In 2020, three ministries merged into the new Ministry of Culture, Tourism and the Environment to cut costs amid the COVID-19 pandemic.

Name changes
The position of Minister of Culture was established in 1975 with António Jacinto as the first to hold the position. 
 1975–1995: Secretary of State for Culture
 1995–2020: Minister of Culture
2020-present: Minister of Culture, Tourism and Environment

Ministers
 1975–1981: António Jacinto
 1981–1990: Boaventura da Silva Cardoso
 1990–1992: José Mateus de Adelino Peixoto
 1995–1999: Ana Maria de Oliveira
 1999–2002: António Burity da Silva
 2002–2008: Boaventura da Silva Cardoso
 2008–2016: Rosa Maria Martins da Cruz e Silva
 2016–2019: Carolina Cerqueira
 2019–2020: Maria da Piedade de Jesus
 April–October 2020: Adjany Costa
 November 2020–October 2021: Jomo Fortunato
 October 2021–present: Filipe Zau

References

External links

 http://www.mincult.gov.ao/

Culture
Culture Ministers
Politics of Angola